Howie is a locality in Alberta, Canada.

James Howie, an early postmaster, gave the community his last name.

References 

Localities in Special Area No. 2